Gregorio Preti (Taverna 1603 - Rome 1672) was a Baroque painter. He was the brother of famous Calabrian painter Mattia Preti. There is a fresco by him in the church of San Carlo ai Catinari at Rome.

References

1603 births
1672 deaths
People from the Province of Catanzaro
17th-century Italian painters
Italian male painters
Italian Baroque painters